The Kent Vase is an annual rugby union knock-out club competition organized by the Kent Rugby Football Union.  It was first introduced during the 2001-02 season, with the inaugural winners being Bromley.  It is the third most important rugby union cup competition in Kent, behind the Kent Cup and Kent Shield but ahead of the Kent Plate and Kent Salver.

The Kent Vase is currently open to the first teams of club sides based in Kent that play in tier 9 (Shepherd Neame Kent 1) and tier 10 (Shepherd Neame Kent 2) of the English rugby union league system.  The format is a knockout cup with a first round, second round, third round, semi-finals and a final, typically to be held at a pre-determined ground at the end of April on the same date and venue as the Cup, Shield, Plate and Salver finals.  Teams that are knocked out of the first round complete for the Kent Salver.

Kent Vase winners

Number of wins
Beccehamian (4)
Cranbrook (2)
Old Gravesendians (2)
Bromley (1)
Dover (1)
Gillingham Anchorians (1)
Lordswood (1)
Medway
Old Elthamians (1)
Sheppey (1)
Snowdown Colliery (1)
Whitstable (1)

See also
 Kent RFU
 Kent Cup
 Kent Shield
 Kent Plate
 Kent Salver
 English rugby union system
 Rugby union in England

References

External links
 Kent RFU

Recurring sporting events established in 2001
2001 establishments in England
Rugby union cup competitions in England
Rugby union in Kent
Vase sports trophies